Gavro Vučković Krajišnik (born in Donji Dabar near Sanski Most 1826 — Belgrade, 1876) was a Bosnian Serb politician, trader and writer.

Biography 
He came from a well-off Bosnian Serb family with a history in dealing with trade of goods. Gavro Vučković traveled around Europe to do business and became fluent in German, French, Greek, Italian, Turkish and later the Arabic language. Vučković represented all Orthodox Christians from Bosnia and Herzegovina in Constantinople. He used this position to further the agenda of the Serbs of Bosnia and Herzegovina, made contributions to education, improved road infrastructure and helped in the restoration of monasteries, including the Rmanj Monastery.

Vučković died on his way to Bosnia from Belgrade in order to join the Herzegovina uprising (1875-1877).

His cousin Konstantin Vučković was one of the richest traders and bankers of his time, active in Dalmatia where he founded Matica Srpska in Dubrovnik.

Works 
Riječ krajišnička, 1868
Robstvo u slobodi ili ogledalo pravde u Bosni, 1872
Crno putovanje za Carigrad, 1910

References 

Bosnia and Herzegovina writers
Serbian politicians
Serbian writers
People from Sanski Most
1826 births
1876 deaths
Serbs of Bosnia and Herzegovina